The Teerathgarh Falls  is  all season tourism's site and a good photography place waterfall near Jagdalpur at Kanger Ghati in Bastar district in the Indian state of Chhattisgarh.

The falls
The Teerathgarh Falls is a block type waterfall on the Kanger River. The water plunges  in a single drop.

Location
One can approach the falls from Darbha, near state highway that connects Jagdalpur to Sukma. One has to take a jeep at Darbha junction to visit Teerathgarh and Kutumsar. Kutumsar Caves and Kailash Gufa are nearby attractions. It is in Kanger Ghati National Park.

See also
 List of waterfalls in India
 List of waterfalls in India by height
 Tamda Ghumar
 Chitrakote Falls
 Kotumsar Cave
 Mendri Ghumar
 Jagdalpur
 Kanger Ghati National Park
 Indravati National Park
 Danteshwari Temple

References

External links

Teerathgarh visit - YouTube

Waterfalls of Chhattisgarh
Bastar district
Waterfalls of India